Kaye Adams (born 28 December 1962) is a Scottish television presenter and journalist.  She was an anchor on ITV topical discussion show Loose Women from 1999 to 2006 and again from 2013 and was a regular panellist on Channel 5's daily morning show The Wright Stuff from 2007 until 2012.

She hosts the morning show on BBC Radio Scotland weekdays from 9am to 12 noon.

Early life
Adams attended Abbotsgrange Middle school in Grangemouth and Grangemouth High before moving to the fee-paying St George's School, Edinburgh and the University of Edinburgh, from which she graduated with an MA Honours in Economics and Politics.

Media career
Adams started her media career as a graduate trainee at Central Television, concentrating on political and news journalism – her first coup was a one-hour interview with Margaret Thatcher. For the next few years, Adams remained focused on hard news when in early 1988 moved to Scottish Television's nightly news programme, Scotland Today. She was one of the first journalists on the scene of the Lockerbie disaster in 1988. In 1992, a chance opportunity to host a discussion show for Scottish Television after its original anchor Sheena McDonald left, set her off on a different path. Scottish Women ran for six years under Adams chair (1993–99), and won a number of awards and marked the start of Adams' career as a talk show host.

Since her original success with Scottish Women, Adams has presented ITV Weekend Live, three series of Central Weekend Live with Nicky Campbell and John Stapleton; Esther, latterly Kaye for BBC Two; and Pride and Prejudice for BBC Scotland. Adams co-presented the last ever This Morning before Richard and Judy left, while in 2002 she was This Morning's daily live anchor from Australia, reporting on the first series of I'm a Celebrity, Get Me Out of Here!. She has also appeared on Lily Savage's Blankety Blank.

Between 1999 and 2006, Adams anchored the ITV talk show, Loose Women where, combined with the rest of the female panel, she created a popular and engaging mix of topical issues and entertainment. On 5 November 2013, Adams returned to the panel in rotation with Carol Vorderman and Andrea McLean. In January 2014, former Loose Woman Ruth Langsford returned to co-anchor the programme with Adams, Vorderman and McLean in rotation. Vorderman left the show in July 2014.

Adams has also presented a daytime show called The People Versus. as well as appearing as a panellist and latterly as chair of Have I Got News for You.

Between 2007 and 2010, Adams regularly guest hosted and was a panellist on the Channel 5 panel show The Wright Stuff.

In late 2008, Adams narrated a six-part documentary series The Merchant Navy on STV.

On 26 May 2009, Adams returned to STV, more than 20 years after her first appearance on the station, as a guest co-host on the lifestyle programme The Hour with Stephen Jardine. Adams presented four shows. In August of that year, Adams joined a long team of reporters on The One Show.

Having reported on the Lockerbie bombing in 1988 for STV, Adams narrated a special documentary, The Lockerbie Bomber: Sent Home to Die for the Scottish television channel which aired on 9 August 2010. The programme examined the Lockerbie bomber's conviction and the renewed controversy over the Scottish Government's decision to send him home to Libya on compassionate grounds a year earlier.

Since 2011, she has guest presented Channel 5's LIVE with... programme.

In 2013, Adams co-hosted the daytime chat show Sunday Scoop with Nadia Sawalha.

Both Nadia Sawalha and Kaye Adams are represented by Nicola Ibison of Ibison Talent Group who acts as both their agent and management. Adams and Nadia Sawalha released a cookery book in 2018 called Nadia & Kaye: Disaster Chef.

In March 2010, Adams joined BBC Radio Scotland to become the host of daily phone-in programme, Call Kaye. The show ended in 2015, and was then replaced by the launch of The Kaye Adams Show, which runs every weekday from 9am to 12pm. Kaye is often covered for by a guest host, particularly on a Friday, due to her work on Loose Women.

In 2022, Adams was a contestant on the twentieth series of Strictly Come Dancing. She was paired with Kai Widdrington and was first to be eliminated.

Personal life
Adams is in a relationship with her long-term partner, tennis coach Ian Campbell, with whom she shares two daughters. They live together in Glasgow. She is good friends with fellow Loose Women panellist Nadia Sawalha.

Adams is a Scottish origin co-patron of Kindred, a Scottish-based charity supporting families of young people with disabilities and mental health issues.

In 2022 Adams admitted she had been lying about her age for around 20 years, knocking a decade off her actual age.

Filmography

See also
 List of Strictly Come Dancing contestants

References

External links

Mornings (BBC Radio Scotland)

1962 births
Living people
Scottish journalists
Scottish television presenters
BBC Radio Scotland presenters
Scottish radio presenters
Scottish game show hosts
People from Grangemouth
Alumni of the University of Edinburgh
People educated at St George's School, Edinburgh

Scottish women journalists
Scottish women television presenters
Scottish women radio presenters